The Voronins is a Russian adaption of the American TV show Everybody Loves Raymond, broadcast from 2009 to 2019. Starting with the 211st episode to its 552nd (and final) episode, the show was based on original scripts based on the show's adaptation writers and Jeremy Stevens, who was a writer on the original American series.

The show's main stars are  Georgy Dronov, Yekaterina Volkova, Boris Klyuyev, Stanislav Duzhnikov, Anna Frolovtseva. Duzhnikov gained 20 kg in order to get the role.

During the filming of the show's 455th episode, it was inducted into the Guinness Book of Records as the longest adapted television show in the world.

In 2015  the show was one of the top five most-watched Russian programs that were not series premieres.

Cast 
 Georgy Dronov as Konstantin "Kostya" Nikolaievich Voronin, Vera's husband, a sports journalist of the newspaper "Sport", in the 390th series moved to work at the publishing house "Global Sport News" (from season 1)
 Yekaterina Volkova as Vera Sergeievna Voronina (née Zolotaryova), a housewife and an educated designer 
 Anna Frolovtseva as Galina Ivanovna Voronina (née Korotkova), Kostya and Leonid's mother, retired, housewife, former teacher at a music school (from season 1)
 Stanislav Duzhnikov as Leonid "Lyonya" Nikolaievich Voronin, captain/major/lieutenant colonel of the  militsiya/police, Kostya's older brother, from the 140 series — Nastya's husband. In the 268th series, he retired from the ranks of the police, and in the 282nd he got a job at a university as a teacher of criminal law, from the 387th series - head of the Department of criminal Law. In series 447, he resigned from the institute. From 498 series — Lieutenant of the Ministry of Emergency Situations of Russia (from season 1).
 Boris Klyuyev as Nikolai Petrovich Voronin, a retired factory turner, who served in the Soviet Border Troops at the China–Russia border
 Mariya Ilyukhina as Mariya "Masha" Konstantinovna Voronina, Kostya and Vera's elder daughter 
 Filipp and Kirill Vorobyov-Mikhins (succeeded by Artyom and Roman Penchuks) as Kirill and Filipp Voronins, Kostya and Vera's identical twin sons. In 462 episodes they are sent to the cadet school (from season 1)
 Julia Kuvarzina as Anastasia Albertovna Voronina (nee Schwartz), Vera's friend and classmate, Leonid's second wife. Baptized as Isolde, her parents are Volga Germans by nationality. Designer by education, in 332 series she got a job as a nanny in kindergarten (1-2, 4-24 seasons)
 Yuka Matveeva (seasons 11-14) / Anatoly Naumov (from season 15) as Alexander Leonidovich Voronin, son of Lenya and Nastya, was born on September 4, 2012 (since season 11)
 Polina Kuzmenko (season 15) / Sofya Khvashchinskaya (seasons 16-17) / Vera Tarasova (from season 18) as Lyudmila Konstantinovna Voronina, the youngest daughter of Kostya and Vera, was born on May 21 (recorded on May 20), 2015 (from season 14)

Critical reception 
Website Vokrug TV deemed The Voronins "perhaps the most beloved family in Russia".

References

External links 
  

Russian television series based on American television series
2009 Russian television series debuts
Russian television sitcoms
2019 Russian television series endings
Television series by Sony Pictures Television
Russian comedy television series
Television series about families